Froylán Greing Ledezma Stephens (born 2 January 1978) is a retired Costa Rican international football forward.

He is nicknamed as El Cachorro which means "The Puppy".

Club career
A strong, quick and explosive striker, he debuted in the Costa Rican league on 14 January 1995 at the age of 17 with Alajuelense against Municipal Pérez Zeledón. In the 1995–96 season, he scored 14 goals and played 41 games, and followed up the next season with 21 goals in 27 matches.

Ajax
He was scouted by Dutch club Ajax Amsterdam and after that, invited for a trial by their big rivals Feyenoord. But Ajax signed him in 1997 for around 4.5 million euros in spectacular fashion after 'kidnapping' him from Amsterdam Airport under Feyenoord's nose. However, the promising youngster was not a success in Dutch football, only playing twice for Ajax. He was suspended by Ajax for indiscipline after his first season until his contract ended (almost three years later).

South America
In 2001, he signed for Cerro Porteño but was not eligible to play immediately since Ajax had not formally released him. In February 2002, overweight and lacking match fitness, Ledezma broke his foot in a warm-up match in Chile. In May 2002, he was taken in custody after an altercation with traffic police outside a bar where he had illegally parked his car.

Ledezma returned to Costa Rica where he surprisingly signed for Saprissa (Alajuelense's archrival). He then joined Bolivian side, The Strongest, regularly appearing in the starting line-up, and playing in the Copa Libertadores. He was only the third Costa Rican to score in the Libertadores after netting in February 2003 against Uruguayan side Fénix.

Alajuelense
Afterwards he returned to Alajuelense amid more controversy when The Strongest claimed Ledezma owed them money for his rights after he walked out on the club. At Alajuelense he became CONCACAF Champions' Cup's champion in 2004 and led the team to their league championship in the 2004–05 season. He started the 2005–06 season with Alajuelense but was suspended by the Costa Rican FA for three months in June 2005 for leaving the national team set-up without permission. He then was loaned to Greek team Akratitos for six months (January – June 2006), then he was bought by Austrian club SC Rheindorf Altach. He had an acceptable campaign and by the end of the season he was sold again to FC Augsburg.

Admira Wacker Mödling
On a quick transaction he was transferred to VfB Admira Wacker Mödling. More controversy ensued, however, as he was sent back to the reserve team in October 2009 claiming the club owed him 3 months wages.

In 2009, after Costa Rica's national team's poor performance under Hernán Medford's direction, a new head coach, Rodrigo Kenton, was hired and he called Ledezma back to the national team where he performed well.

Ledezma was released from VfB Admira Wacker Mödling and joined Costa Rican club Herediano in June 2010. only to leave them after just five months as he rejoined VfB Admira Wacker Mödling. He started playing well in Austrian second division, his club winning promotion to the 1st league. He played just a few games as substitute in the 2011 season but then suffered a shoulder injury which sidelined him for four months.

Final season
After he recovered from the injury, he decided to end his contract with VfB Admira Wacker Mödling and to move back to Costa Rica to play with Alajuelense. He announced his retirement in August 2012 after failing to regain full fitness.

International career
Ledezma played for Costa Rica in the 1997 FIFA World Youth Championship held in Malaysia.

He made his senior debut for Costa Rica in a September 1997 FIFA World Cup qualification match against Jamaica and earned a total of 22 caps, scoring 6 goals. He helped his country win the UNCAF Nations Cup 1999 and has also appeared in three qualifying matches for the 2006 FIFA World Cup and 6 qualifying matches for the 2010 FIFA World Cup. He also played at the 2009 CONCACAF Gold Cup.

His final international was a September 2009 FIFA World Cup qualification match against El Salvador.

Retirement
Ledezma retired after the 2012 summer tournament. In January 2014 he was injured in a car accident near Orotina.

Honours
Primera División de Costa Rica:
1995–96, 1996–97, 2004–05
Copa Interclubes UNCAF:
1996, 2005
UNCAF Nations Cup:
1999
Liga de Fútbol Profesional Boliviano:
2003-C
CONCACAF Champions' Cup:
2004

Career statistics

International goals
Scores and results list. Costa Rica's goal tally first.

References

External links
 

1978 births
Living people
Footballers from San José, Costa Rica
Association football forwards
Costa Rican footballers
Costa Rica under-20 international footballers
Costa Rica international footballers
2009 CONCACAF Gold Cup players
L.D. Alajuelense footballers
AFC Ajax players
Cerro Porteño players
Deportivo Saprissa players
The Strongest players
A.P.O. Akratitos Ano Liosia players
SC Rheindorf Altach players
FC Augsburg players
FC Admira Wacker Mödling players
C.S. Herediano footballers
Liga FPD players
Eredivisie players
2. Bundesliga players
Costa Rican expatriate footballers
Expatriate footballers in the Netherlands
Costa Rican expatriate sportspeople in the Netherlands
Expatriate footballers in Paraguay
Costa Rican expatriate sportspeople in Paraguay
Expatriate footballers in Bolivia
Costa Rican expatriate sportspeople in Bolivia
Expatriate footballers in Greece
Costa Rican expatriate sportspeople in Greece
Expatriate footballers in Austria
Costa Rican expatriate sportspeople in Austria
Expatriate footballers in Germany
Costa Rican expatriate sportspeople in Germany
Copa Centroamericana-winning players